The Chocolate Girl (French: La petite chocolatière) is a 1950 French  musical comedy film directed by André Berthomieu and starring Giselle Pascal, Claude Dauphin and Henri Genès. It is based on a play by Paul Gavault. An earlier adaptation The Chocolate Girl was released in 1932.

It was shot at the Saint-Maurice Studios in Paris and on location around the city. The art director Raymond Nègre designed the film's sets.

Main cast
 Giselle Pascal as Benjamine Lapistolle
 Claude Dauphin as Paul Normand
 Henri Genès as Félicien Bédarride
 Jeannette Batti as Rosette
 Bernard Lajarrige as Raoul Pinglet
 Georges Lannes as Lapistolle
 Henri Crémieux as Mingassol
 Paulette Dubost as Julie
 Charles Bouillaud as Le maître d'hôtel
 Max Elloy as Le garçon
 Colette Georges as Simone
 Jean Hébey as Le fêtard
 Gaston Orbal as Eugène

References

Bibliography
 Goble, Alan. The Complete Index to Literary Sources in Film. Walter de Gruyter, 1999.

External links

1950 films
1950 musical comedy films
1950s French-language films
French films based on plays
Films directed by André Berthomieu
Remakes of French films
French musical comedy films
French black-and-white films
1950s French films